Left of the Dial: Dispatches from the '80s Underground is a four-disc alternative rock compilation album released by Rhino Records in 2004.  Chris Dahlen of Pitchfork notes that "mandate of Left of the Dial—to showcase anything that fit on college radio in the 80s—-- means you'll find everything from punk and post-punk to synth-pop and dream-pop".  The term "left of the dial", taken from a Replacements song (that does not appear in this collection), refers to the college and other non-commercial FM radio stations in the U.S., with frequencies typically in the reserved band on the left (i.e. lower) end of the FM broadcast band of the radio spectrum.

Track listing

References

External links
 Left of the Dial at Metacritic

2004 compilation albums
Alternative rock compilation albums
Rhino Records compilation albums